Fresh Maggots are a folk duo from Nuneaton, Warwickshire in England, consisting of Mick Burgoyne and Leigh Dolphin, who played a variety of instruments including guitars, glockenspiel, tin whistles and strings. They released two albums in 1971 and 2020, but sustained interest in the 1970 album saw it re-released in several times.

History
Taking their name from a newspaper advert for a sports shop that proclaimed "fresh maggots always available", the pair were spotted by Mike Berry of the Sparta Florida Music Company in September 1970 while playing only their second concert at Wolvey village hall, and signed a publishing deal with the company. They were signed by RCA Records, who released their only album in 1971 - when they were nineteen years of age. Fresh Maggots was recorded at the Radio Luxembourg studios in London over several months at a cost of 1,500 pounds, and produced by Berry. Although its release was preceded by some degree of anticipation, delays in publishing gradually saw interest wane. Upon its release, it was met with favourable reviews, however record sales did not reflect this, and pressing was decommissioned soon after. The duo went on to play two live shows broadcast by BBC Radio 1. They released one single, "Car Song", before splitting up.

The resurgent popularity of folk music over the last decade reawakened interest in the band and the album became a collector's item fetching hundreds of pounds; The duo started to receive airplay in the US, prompting a reissue in 2006 as Fresh Maggots...Hatched on the Sunbeam label in the UK and Amber Soundroom in Germany, with the tracks from the "Car Song" single added. The reissued album received a three and a half stars review from Allmusic, and an 8 out of 10 score from PopMatters, with Whitney Strub describing it as "a remarkably assured debut—and finale". Kevin Hainey, reviewing it for Exclaim!, stated the group's "concise and fast-paced songwriting tendencies certainly make this stuff transcend its own age in a strange and wonderful way". John M. James, in the River Cities' Reader described it as a "five-star masterpiece of hypnotic vocals, electric fuzz guitar, trippy tin whistle, and shimmering six- and 12-string guitars".
After being contacted by a German music magazine for an interview in 2017 they started writing songs again. 
Their album 'Waiting For The Sun' was released in October 2020 exactly 49 years after the release of their first album.

Discography

Albums
Fresh Maggots (1971), RCA Victor - reissued in 2006 on Sunbeam as Fresh Maggots...Hatched
Waiting For The Sun (2020), Coventry Music Museum Records.

Singles
"Car Song" (1971), RCA Victor

Compilation appearances
"Rosemary Hill" on Gather In The Mushrooms (The British Acid Folk Underground 1968-1974) (2004), Castle
"Dole Song" on Synchedelic (2007), Music Sales Film & TV 
"Dole Song" on Shifting Sands (20 Treasures From The Heyday Of Underground Folk) (2009), Sunbeam
"Rosemary Hill" on Dust On The Nettles (A Journey Through The British Underground Folk Scene 1967-1972) (2015), Grapefruit
"House Carpenter" (Unreleased demo track) on Sumer Is Icumen In: The Pagan Sound of British and Irish Folk 1966–75 (2020), Grapefruit 
"What I Am" (Unreleased demo track)  on  "Strangers in the room" (2019), Grapefruit

References

English folk musical groups
Musical groups established in 1970
Musical groups disestablished in 1971